Nikolayevka is a rural locality (a village) in Dedovsky Selsoviet, Fyodorovsky District, Bashkortostan, Russia. The population was 18 as of 2010. There is 1 street.

Geography 
Nikolayevka is located 8 km southwest of Fyodorovka (the district's administrative centre) by road. Akbulatovo is the nearest rural locality.

References 

Rural localities in Fyodorovsky District